Behind the Mask is a 1932 American pre-Code crime/horror film directed by John Francis Dillon and starring Jack Holt, Boris Karloff and Edward Van Sloan.

Plot
A federal agent (Holt) goes undercover to infiltrate a drug smuggling operation headed by a mysterious Mr. X (Van Sloan), a criminal mastermind whose identity is unknown even to his henchmen. Mr. X is also running a bogus hospital where victims are killed on the operating table, and their coffins stuffed with narcotics. The drug-filled coffins are then buried in a cemetery.

Cast
 Jack Holt as Jack Hart aka Quinn 
 Constance Cummings as Julie Arnold
 Boris Karloff as Jim Henderson
 Claude King as Arnold 
 Bertha Mann as Nurse Edwards 
 Edward Van Sloan as Dr. August Steiner / Dr. Alec Munsell / Mr. X
 Willard Robertson as Capt. E.J. Hawkes 
 Thomas E. Jackson as Agent Burke (as Tommy Jackson)

See also
 List of American films of 1932
 Boris Karloff filmography

References

External links

 

1932 films
1930s crime thriller films
American black-and-white films
American police detective films
American crime thriller films
Films directed by John Francis Dillon
Columbia Pictures films
Films with screenplays by Jo Swerling
1930s English-language films
1930s American films